The 1951 Cleveland Indians season was a season in American baseball. The team finished second in the American League with a record of 93–61, 5 games behind the New York Yankees.

Offseason 
 March 20, 1951: Grant Dunlap was purchased from the Indians by the Shreveport Sports.

Regular season

Season standings

Record vs. opponents

Notable transactions 
 April 30, 1951: Minnie Miñoso was traded by the Indians to the Chicago White Sox, and Sam Zoldak and Ray Murray were traded by the Indians to the Philadelphia Athletics as part of a three-team trade. The Athletics sent Lou Brissie to the Indians, and sent Paul Lehner to the White Sox. The White Sox sent Gus Zernial and Dave Philley to the Athletics.

Roster

Player stats

Batting

Starters by position 
Note: Pos = Position; G = Games played; AB = At bats; H = Hits; Avg. = Batting average; HR = Home runs; RBI = Runs batted in

Other batters 
Note: G = Games played; AB = At bats; H = Hits; Avg. = Batting average; HR = Home runs; RBI = Runs batted in

Pitching

Starting pitchers 
Note: G = Games pitched; IP = Innings pitched; W = Wins; L = Losses; ERA = Earned run average; SO = Strikeouts

Other pitchers 
Note: G = Games pitched; IP = Innings pitched; W = Wins; L = Losses; ERA = Earned run average; SO = Strikeouts

Relief pitchers 
Note: G = Games pitched; W = Wins; L = Losses; SV = Saves; ERA = Earned run average; SO = Strikeouts

Awards and records

League leaders 
 Bob Feller, American League leader, wins

Farm system 

LEAGUE CHAMPIONS: Spartanburg

Notes

References 
1951 Cleveland Indians season at Baseball Reference

Cleveland Indians seasons
Cleveland Indians season
Cleveland Indians